David Boulton is an American learning activist, documentary film producer, writer, and lecturer. Boulton has designed software for Apple, Pacific Bell, and other organizations.  Boulton has published numerous articles in professional journals and has lectured internationally.  He has founded five companies and holds four patents. Boulton is the director of Learning Stewards and the Children of the Code Project which extends his work on learning to the challenges involved in learning to read.

References

External links
 Children of the Code.org
 Learning Stewards.org

Year of birth missing (living people)
Living people
American non-fiction writers